Simona Amânar (born 7 October 1979) is a Romanian former artistic gymnast. She is a seven-time Olympic and ten-time World Championship medalist.  Amânar helped Romania win four consecutive world team titles (1994–1999), as well as the 2000 Olympic team title. She is also the 2000 Olympic all-around champion. She has a vault named after her, one of the most difficult in women's gymnastics, and was inducted into the International Gymnastics Hall of Fame in 2007.

Biography
Simona Amânar is an ethnic Aromanian.

Career

1994–1995
In 1994, her first year on the senior national team, Amânar contributed to Romania's team titles at the World and European Championships.

Amânar began to excel as an individual performer at the 1995 European Cup, placing second in the all-around behind Svetlana Khorkina of Russia and winning gold on both vault and floor exercise. At the 1995 World Championships, she helped Romania secure its second consecutive world team title and became co-champion on vault (with all-around winner Lilia Podkopayeva of Ukraine). Amânar's powerful floor routine and vaults put her in the lead after two rotations in the all-around, but she dropped to fourth after an average uneven bars routine and a shaky balance beam routine.

1996
Amânar won a silver medal on vault at the 1996 World Championships, behind teammate Gina Gogean and ahead of Cuba's Annia -Hatch.

At the 1996 Summer Olympics, Amânar was one of the front-runners for several individual medals, but her Olympics started inauspiciously when she fell off the beam during the compulsories. Though she later posted the highest all-around score in the optionals (39.387, her lowest score being a 9.800 on the balance beam), her combined compulsory and optionals scores put her fourth among her teammates, and she did not qualify for the final. However, in a scenario similar to the Unified Team's substitution of Tatiana Gutsu for Rozalia Galiyeva at the 1992 Olympics, Amânar replaced her teammate Alexandra Marinescu in the all-around final. The Romanian head coach, Octavian Bellu, said that Amânar deserved to compete because she had worked harder and was a better athlete than Marinescu. Amânar ended up sharing the bronze medal with teammate Lavinia Miloşovici, behind Gogean.

In both the 1996 Olympic all-around and the 1995 World Championships all-around, Amânar failed to score over 9.800 on the floor exercise despite well-executed and difficult tumbling. In the Olympics, she scored a 9.887 in the team optionals (the highest score of the entire Olympics on any event, for men or women), but only a 9.737 in the all-around. She did not start from a 10.0 in the all-around—despite having the most tumbling bonus points of anyone at the Games—because her tour jeté half-turn (Strug), a C element, was not completed. Thus, she did not have enough simple A, B, and C skills, and much of her D- and E-rated tumbling had to count as easier elements to fulfill those requirements. Amânar did not perform a double turn in the team optionals or the all-around because it was not necessary as long as she completed her Strug. However, when she failed to complete the Strug, four of her six tenths in D and E elements had to count toward requirements, which left her with only .2 counting toward her bonus. Without the error, Amânar would have finished ahead of Gogean and Miloşovici.

In the event finals, Amânar completed her Strug and added a double turn to fulfill the more stringent Competition III requirements. She earned a 9.850 and the silver medal, behind Podkopayeva and just ahead of Dominique Dawes of the United States. She won the vault final the day before, largely because of her 9.875 score for her double-twisting Yurchenko vault. She left the 1996 Olympics with four medals, including Romania's team bronze.

1997–1999
Romania won its third straight team title at the 1997 World Championships. Amânar again replaced a higher-scoring Marinescu in the all-around competition and won the silver medal behind Russia's Khorkina, followed by a gold medal on vault.

In the 1999 World Championships, Amânar led the Romanian team to a fourth consecutive title (there was no Worlds competition in 1998). However, she fell off the bars during the all-around and placed well out of the medals. She also lost her vaulting title to Russia's Elena Zamolodchikova, who dominated that event in the following years due to a more difficult second vault: a double-twisting Tsukahara. Amânar won her only medal of the competition on the floor, taking home the silver behind teammate Andreea Răducan.

2000
At the 2000 Summer Olympics, the Romanians edged out the Russians to take the team title—their first since 1984 and their first ever in a non-boycotted Olympics.

In the all-around, the vaulting horse was set too low by the Olympic organizers, and the favorite for the title, Svetlana Khorkina, fell on her signature vault. Several other gymnasts fell or stumbled because of the same problem. Many went on to make mistakes on their next event, knowing their medal chances were gone, only to be informed later of the error and their chance to vault again. The three Romanian women either managed to perform well on the faulty vault or vaulted after the mistake had been corrected. They swept the medals, with Răducan winning the gold, Amânar the silver, and Maria Olaru the bronze.

Răducan was subsequently found to have used a cold medicine containing a banned substance. Although her results in other events were allowed to stand, she was stripped of her all-around gold medal, which went to Amânar. Initially, Amânar refused to accept the medal, insisting that Răducan had rightfully earned the title. Olaru took the same stance when the silver was awarded to her. However, they eventually reconsidered and decided to bring the medals home to Romania as symbolic victories of the country. Amânar continued to insist, however, that Răducan was the true Olympic all-around champion. 

In the event finals, Amânar had the opportunity to defend her Olympic vault title from four years earlier. However, she stumbled badly while debuting a new vault (a 2 twisting laid-out Yurchenko, which was then named after her), and did not win a medal. She went on to win bronze on floor exercise after losing points for a step out of bounds on her last tumbling pass.

Legacy
Amânar ranks highly (117th) on the list of most medal gymnasts in the world, with 10 World and 7 Olympic medals. She played a large role in the four consecutive World team titles and Olympic title that established Romania as the top-ranked women's gymnastics team in the world.

The Amanar vault involves a round-off entry onto the vaulting table followed by a laid-out salto with 2 twists. Amânar first competed this skill at the 2000 Olympics. It has a difficulty score of 6.5, 6.3 and 5.8 in the women's 2009–2012, 2013–2016 and 2017–2020 Code of Points.

Post-retirement
Amânar retired in 2000, shortly after the Olympic Games. She married Cosmin Tabără, a lawyer, on 9 March 2002, in Timișoara, and gave birth to a son, Alexandru Iosif, five months later. She is the vice president of the Romanian Gymnastics Federation.

Eponymous skill
Amânar has one eponymous skill in the Code of Points, the Amanar vault.

Competitive history

See also

 List of Olympic female gymnasts for Romania
 List of Olympic medal leaders in women's gymnastics
 List of top female medalists at the World Artistic Gymnastics Championships

References

External links
 Bio at romanian-gymnastics.com
 List of competitive results at Gymn Forum
 Amânar (vault skills)
 
 
 
 

1979 births
Living people
Sportspeople from Constanța
Aromanian sportspeople
Romanian people of Aromanian descent
Romanian female artistic gymnasts
Olympic gold medalists for Romania
Olympic silver medalists for Romania
Olympic bronze medalists for Romania
Olympic gymnasts of Romania
Olympic medalists in gymnastics
Gymnasts at the 1996 Summer Olympics
Gymnasts at the 2000 Summer Olympics
Medalists at the 1996 Summer Olympics
Medalists at the 2000 Summer Olympics
World champion gymnasts
Medalists at the World Artistic Gymnastics Championships
European champions in gymnastics
Originators of elements in artistic gymnastics
Competitors at the 1998 Goodwill Games
Goodwill Games medalists in gymnastics